The Ponte Madonna della Stella, also known as the Ponte Acquedotto Madonna della Stella, Ponte Viadotto-Acquedotto Madonna della Stella, or simply il ponte di Gravina, amongst other combinations, is an eighteenth-century bridge and aqueduct over the Gravina in the southern Italian town of Gravina in Puglia.

Name
The bridge takes its name from the mediaeval church and rock sanctuary, dedicated to the Madonna, which overlooks the gorge. The bridge leads from the town centre to the east. According to local tradition, Mary was formerly depicted, in a now-lost fresco, in a blue mantle with a silver star (Italian: stella); this image is said to have been revered during the Renaissance as a dispenser of miracles.

Description
It spans the Gravina torrent, formerly known as the Crapo, and functions also as an aqueduct.

It leads to two fountains, Fontana La Stella to the west before the bridge is reached, for the supply of drinking water, and another at the east end of the bridge, for use in a washhouse.

History
An earlier bridge that connected the two banks and allowed the faithful to reach the church is first documented in 1686. Likely damaged in the earthquake of that year, it subsequently collapsed in the earthquake of 1722. Around the middle of the century, the Orsini family ordered its reconstruction and transformation into an aqueduct, to bring to the town the waters from the Sant'Angelo and San Giacomo springs. Work on the aqueduct, supervised by the engineer Di Costanzo, and of which the bridge carries but a short part, commenced in 1743 and was largely completed in 1778. A series of twenty-five arches formerly carried the water channel over the bridge, but, damaged by a flood in August 1855, they were replaced by a wall of tuff. In 1860, iron tie bars were fitted and rustic paving installed.

The bridge is featured in the pre-credit sequence of the 2021 James Bond film No Time to Die, where it was cinematographically transplanted from Gravina in Puglia to connect Matera with its necropolis; to protect the historic structure during filming (in 2019), it was lined with sheets of steel, and to allow for Bond's leap, fitted with dummy electric cabling. The bridge has also been used in the upcoming The Way of the Wind. At the end of 2019, in recognition of its cultural importance and touristic potential, and specifically citing its recent use at the time in international film productions, the Regione of Apulia awarded a grant of €1.5 million for works on the bridge, including the removal of accretions, pre-emptive weed control, crack mitigation, and improved illumination.

Gallery

See also

 Metropolitan City of Bari
 Alta Murgia National Park

References

Aqueducts in Italy
Buildings and structures in the Province of Bari
Bridges in Italy